Malli Maduve  is a 1963 Indian Kannada-language film, directed by G. R. Nathan. The film stars Rajkumar, Udaykumar, Rajashankar and K. S. Ashwath. The film has musical score by G. K. Venkatesh. The film was a remake of Tamil film Velaikaari (1949).

Rajkumar plays a dual role in the movie. However, this movie is not considered as a movie with double role since the second character appears only for three seconds on-screen in spite of it being an important plot twist.

Cast

Rajkumar as Ananda and Paramananda (dual roles)
Udaykumar
Rajashankar
K. S. Ashwath
Narasimharaju
Sahukar Janaki
Leelavathi
Meenakumari
Ramadevi
Papamma
Jorge Indra
Ganapathi Bhat
Kupparaj
Krishna Shastry
Girimaji
M. Shivaji
Srikanth
Chellapilla Satyam

Soundtrack
The music was composed by G. K. Venkatesh.

References

External links
 

1963 films
1960s Kannada-language films
Films scored by G. K. Venkatesh
Kannada remakes of Tamil films